Olenecamptus quadriplagiatus is a species of beetle in the family Cerambycidae. It was described by Dillon and Dillon in 1948. It is known from Vietnam.

References

Dorcaschematini
Beetles described in 1948